Eucalyptus corrugata, also known as rough fruited mallee or rib-fruited mallee, is a species of tree or mallee that is endemic to Western Australia. It has rough scaly or fibrous bark on the lower part of its trunk, smooth bark above, glossy, lance-shaped adult leaves, prominently corrugated flower buds arranged in groups of three in leaf axils and ribbed, conical to cup-shaped fruit.

Description
The bark on the upper part of the trunk and on the branches is smooth and grey over salmon pink. The adult leaves are arranged alternately, thick, the same glossy green on both sides and lance-shaped to curved. Flowering occurs between October and March and the flowers are white.

Taxonomy and naming
Eucalyptus corrugata was first formally described by the botanist Johann George Luehmann in 1897 in The Victorian Naturalist, from a specimen collected from the Golden Valley near Bullfinch. The specific epithet (corrugata) is a Latin word meaning “wrinkled” or "ridged", referring to the ribbed operculum of the buds.

Distribution and habitat
The rough-fruited mallee is distributed through the Avon Wheatbelt, Coolgardie and Murchison biogeographic regions of Western Australia, especially between Westonia, Mount Jackson, Kalgoorlie and Marvel Loch. It grows in open woodland and shrubland in rocky clay loam soils.

Conservation status
This eucalypt is classified as "not threatened" by the Western Australian Government Department of Parks and Wildlife.

See also
List of Eucalyptus species

References

corrugata
Endemic flora of Western Australia
Mallees (habit)
Myrtales of Australia
Eucalypts of Western Australia
Trees of Australia
Goldfields-Esperance
Plants described in 1897